Penny E. Harrington (March 2, 1942 – September 15, 2021) was an American police officer who became the first female chief of the Portland Police Bureau, making her the first female to head a major police department in the United States.

Career
Harrington began working as a policewoman in 1964, when there were only 12 women in her department. She was appointed chief of the Portland Police Bureau in January 1985. An investigative report characterized her administration as a failure after 17 months. The recommendation by a three-member panel appointed by Mayor Bud Clark resulted in her resignation in 1986.

In 1987 Harrington filed a federal sex discrimination suit claiming that members of the police department "conspired to embarrass and drive her from office", making it difficult for her to obtain employment following her "forced" resignation. In 1988 Harrington became a special assistant to the California State Bar's director of investigations to "handle a wide range of special projects, including training and computers".

In 1995, she founded The National Center for Women & Policing with Katherine Spillar, Executive Vice President of the Feminist Majority Foundation. The NCWP aims to promote increasing the number of women throughout all ranks of law enforcement in an effort to improve police response to violence against women, as well as reduce police brutality and excessive force, and improve community policing reforms. Harrington died on September 15, 2021, in Morro Bay, California, where she lived.

Bibliography
Harrington was the author of three books. With the NCWP, Harrington helped write Recruiting & Retaining Women: A Self Assessment Guide for Law Enforcement, aimed at helping law enforcement agencies increase and maintain the number of female officers in their units. Harrington also co-authored the text Investigating Sexual Harassment in Law Enforcement Agencies with Kimberly A. Lonsway, to address issues of sexual harassment in fire and police departments and promote proactivity through prevention and training. In 1999, Harrington wrote an autobiography, published by Brittany Publications, Ltd., titled Triumph of Spirit about her successes, trails, and tribulations during her time working for the police force.

See also
 Beverly Harvard
 List of American women's firsts

References

External links
 Image: 1985 Police Chief Penny Harrington, Police Sunshine Division

1942 births
2021 deaths
American women police officers
People from Lansing, Michigan
Chiefs of the Portland Police Bureau
21st-century American women